Aleh Akhrem or Olieg Achrem (born 12 March 1983) is a Belarusian professional volleyball coach and former volleyball player, a former member of the Belarus national team, with which he competed in the 2013 European Championship. He currently serves as an assistant coach for Asseco Resovia.

Personal life
Aleh was born in Grodno. On 5 January 2011, he received Polish citizenship (he changed his name as a result). He is married to Natalia. They have two sons, Igor and Daniel.

Career

Clubs
He was one of the main players and later the captain of Asseco Resovia. In 2016, Akhrem moved to Turkey where he played for Halkbank Ankara and Galatasaray. In May 2018, Akhrem came back to Poland, and signed a contract with Aluron Virtu Warta Zawiercie

Honours

Clubs
 CEV Champions League
  2008/2009 – with Iraklis Thessaloniki
  2014/2015 – with Asseco Resovia
 CEV Cup
  2011/2012 – with Asseco Resovia
 National championships
 2001/2002  Belarusian Championship, with Kommunalnik Grodno
 2002/2003  Belarusian Championship, with Kommunalnik Grodno
 2004/2005  Belarusian Cup, with Kommunalnik Grodno
 2004/2005  Belarusian Championship, with Kommunalnik Grodno
 2005/2006  Belarusian Championship, with Kommunalnik Mogilev
 2006/2007  Belarusian Championship, with Kommunalnik Mogilev
 2007/2008  Greek SuperCup, with Iraklis Thessaloniki
 2007/2008  Greek Championship, with Iraklis Thessaloniki
 2008/2009  Greek SuperCup, with Iraklis Thessaloniki
 2011/2012  Polish Championship, with Asseco Resovia
 2012/2013  Polish Championship, with Asseco Resovia
 2013/2014  Polish SuperCup, with Asseco Resovia
 2014/2015  Polish Championship, with Asseco Resovia
 2016/2017  Turkish Championship, with Halkbank Ankara

References

External links

 
 Player profile at PlusLiga.pl 
 Player profile at Volleybox.net

1983 births
Living people
Sportspeople from Grodno
Naturalized citizens of Poland
Belarusian men's volleyball players
Greek Champions of men's volleyball
Polish Champions of men's volleyball
Belarusian expatriate sportspeople in Greece
Expatriate volleyball players in Greece
Belarusian expatriate sportspeople in Poland
Expatriate volleyball players in Poland
Iraklis V.C. players
Resovia (volleyball) players
Halkbank volleyball players
Galatasaray S.K. (men's volleyball) players
Warta Zawiercie players
Outside hitters